Viktor Fedosovich Voroshilov (born August 15, 1926, in Vsekhsvyatskoye village - now incorporated into Moscow; died March 5, 2011) was a Soviet football player.

Honours
 Soviet Top League runner-up: 1959.
 Soviet Cup winner: 1957.
 Soviet Cup runner-up: 1953.
 Top 33 players year-end list: 1951, 1958.
 Grigory Fedotov Club member: 117 goals.

International career
Voroshilov played his only game for USSR on August 30, 1958, in a friendly against Czechoslovakia and scored a goal in that game.

References

External links
  Profile

1926 births
2011 deaths
Soviet footballers
Soviet Union international footballers
Russian footballers
Soviet Top League players
PFC Krylia Sovetov Samara players
FC Lokomotiv Moscow players
Association football forwards